Rokautskyia pseudoscaposa is a species of flowering plant in the family Bromeliaceae, endemic to Brazil (the state of Espírito Santo). It was first described by Lyman Bradford Smith in 1955 as Cryptanthus pseudoscaposus.

References

pseudoscaposa
Flora of Brazil
Plants described in 1955